Arugba is a 2008 film.

Synopsis 
Adetutu faces many responsibilities. She must juggle her role as Arugba (the virgin) in the annual community festival with her studies at the university. She must also care for an ailing and grieving friend. Other plot points include Adejare, a demanding king, Adetutu's blossoming musical career, and her growing fondness for a gifted artist named Makinwa which places a strain on Adetutu's relationship with the other members of her all female musical group.

Prizes 
 Africa Movie Academy Awards 2009

References

External links

2008 films
Nigerian drama films
Yoruba-language films
Best Costume Design Africa Movie Academy Award winners
Films directed by Tunde Kelani